Alcidion sulphurifer is a species of longhorn beetles of the subfamily Lamiinae. It was described by White in 1855, and is known from Brasil, Peru, Ecuador, and Bolivia.

References

Beetles described in 1855
Beetles of South America
Alcidion